The Mater Private Hospital is a private hospital business. Its main hospital is located just to the east of the Mater Misericordiae University Hospital in Dublin, Ireland. In addition to the main hospital in Dublin, the business has a hospital in Cork, cancer treatment centres in Limerick and Liverpool and various out-patient clinics.

History
The Mater Private Hospital in Dublin was built on the site of No 7 Eccles Street, the home of the main character (Leopold Bloom) in James Joyce's Ulysses. In Joyce's youth, No 7 Eccles Street was the actual home of his contemporary, JF Byrne. Its founders included Sister Gemma Byrne who became the first chief executive after the Dublin hospital's opening in May 1986. The Mater Private Group was sold to Infravia Capital Partners for about €500 million in 2018.

Development
In 2022 it signed a deal with Meditech to implement its electronic health record. This will include a specialty specific solution for oncologists.

Funding
Patients may be self-paying, covered by private health insurance, or funded under the state's National Treatment Purchase Fund (NTPF).  In 2010, the hospital received €23 million in NTPF funds, the largest payment to any single institution.  In 2011 it was announced that the NTPF programme would be wound down.

Accreditation
In 2002, the Dublin hospital received Joint Commission accreditation.

References

External links
 

Catholic hospitals in Europe
Hospitals established in 1986
Hospitals in Dublin (city)
1986 establishments in Ireland
Private hospitals in the Republic of Ireland